"Hyacinth House" is a song written and performed by the Doors. It appears on the band's final album with frontman Jim Morrison, L.A. Woman (1971). Its lyrics were written by Morrison, while the music was composed by keyboardist Ray Manzarek.

Composition and recording
Contrary to all the other album tracks which were recorded on a professional-quality 8-channel recorder, "Hyacinth House" was recorded on a four track tape machine. Morrison recorded his vocals on the studio's bathroom due to the audio's resolution.

Withal the other songs on L.A. Woman, the album liner notes list the track's songwriters as the Doors; the performance rights organization ASCAP shows the writers as the individual Doors members.  However, the music has also been attributed to keyboardist Ray Manzarek, which references Frédéric Chopin's Polonaise in A-flat major, Op. 53 during the organ solo, and the lyrics to Morrison, while he was at guitarist Robby Krieger's beach house.

Lyrics
The title along with some of the lyrics, refer to the mythological Hyacinth, who was a beautiful youth and lover of the Greek god Apollo. According to the myth, Apollo accidentally killed Hyacinthus in a discus throwing contest when the latter ran to catch Apollo's discus in an effort to impress the god. After the unfortunate death, Apollo refused to let Hades claim the youth. Rather, from Hyacinthus blood, Apollo created the hyacinth, a plant with a fragrant cluster of flowers.
 
"Hyacinth House" includes many lyrics surrounding Morrison's upheaval about his personal life and relationships. The line "someone who doesn’t need me", refers to his troubles with girlfriend Pamela Courson. According to Krieger, the line heard in the song's bridge: "I see the bathroom is clear" is a reference to an occurrence when Morrison's friend Babe Hill left the studio's bathroom so Morrison could use it to record his vocals. Krieger has also said that the line "To please the lions" was inspired after Morrison was in Krieger's house and saw a baby bobcat that he had owned. Doors' drummer John Densmore said about Morrison's interpretation and lyrics, "He was re-examining, but not with regret. Toward the end, Jim said, 'Probably next time, I'd be a little solitary, Zen gardener working in his garden.' I don't interpret that as a regret, but he had a hunch."

Reception
"Hyacinth House" has been variously reviewed by both critics and authors. In a PopMatters review of the 40th Anniversary edition of L.A. Woman, Nathan Wisnicki commented that Jim Morrison's delivery is "a bit lethargic and flaccid," while describing some of the song's lyricism to be "laughable". The Doors FAQ author Richie Weidman, declared "Hyacinth House" as "one of the strangest Doors' songs ever recorded." Band drummer John Densmore acknowledged it one of Morrison's "saddest songs".

Stereogum critic Michael Nelson, who ranked L.A. Woman the second best Doors album, praised "Hyacinth House" as "secretly one of the Doors' finest songs" and that it 
"still fits into the universe of L.A. Woman." He viewed Morrison's delivery of the lyrics "And I'll say it again / I need a brand new friend" sounding "like a man who has seen way too much for his young age. Who knows what could've come after." Rolling Stone critic Narendra Kusnur considered it to be one of Morrison's 10 most underrated songs, saying that lines like "'I need a brand new friend who doesn’t bother me, I need a brand new friend who doesn’t trouble me, I need someone, yeah who doesn’t need me' were charged with emotion, and were an example of Morrison’s intense side."

Personnel
Per 2007 reissue of L.A. Woman CD booklet:

The Doors
 Jim Morrison – vocals
 Ray Manzarek – Hammond organ
 Robby Krieger – guitar
 John Densmore – drums

Additional musicians
 Jerry Scheff – bass guitar

References 

The Doors songs
1971 songs
Songs written by John Densmore
Songs written by Robby Krieger
Songs written by Ray Manzarek
Songs written by Jim Morrison
Song recordings produced by Bruce Botnick